List of champions of the 1895 U.S. National Championships tennis tournament (now known as the US Open). The men's tournament was held from 18 August to 25 August on the outdoor grass courts at the Newport Casino in Newport, Rhode Island. The women's tournament was held from 25 June to 29 June on the outdoor grass courts at the Philadelphia Cricket Club in Philadelphia, Pennsylvania. It was the 16th U.S. National Championships and the second Grand Slam tournament of the year.

Finals

Men's singles

 Fred Hovey defeated  Robert Wrenn  6–3, 6–2, 6–4

Women's singles

 Juliette Atkinson defeated  Helen Hellwig  6–4, 6–2, 6–1

Men's doubles
 Malcolm Chace /  Robert Wrenn defeated  Clarence Hobart /  Fred Hovey 7–5, 6–1, 8–6

Women's doubles
 Helen Hellwig /  Juliette Atkinson defeated  Elisabeth Moore /  Amy Williams 6–2, 6–2, 12–10

Mixed doubles
 Juliette Atkinson /  Edwin P. Fischer defeated  Amy Williams /  Mantle Fielding 4–6, 8–6, 6–2

References

External links
Official US Open website

 
U.S. National Championships
U.S. National Championships (tennis) by year
U.S. National Championships
U.S. National Championships
U.S. National Championships
U.S. National Championships
U.S. National Championships